Claes Arne Borg (18 August 1901 – 7 November 1987) was a Swedish swimmer. He is best known for breaking 32 world records and winning five Olympic medals in the 1920s. In 1926 Borg won the Svenska Dagbladet Gold Medal, shared with Edvin Wide. Next year, at the 1927 European Championships, he set a new world record in the 1500 m at 19:07.2 which stood for nearly 11 years. Besides swimming, Borg also won a European silver medal in water polo in 1926. His twin brother Åke was also an Olympic medalist in swimming.

At the end of his swimming career Borg turned professional and toured with aquatic shows. After that he worked as a swimming coach and ran his tobacco shop in Stockholm.

His daughter Inga Borg (1925-2017) was a children's book writer.

See also
 List of members of the International Swimming Hall of Fame
World record progression 400 metres freestyle
World record progression 800 metres freestyle
World record progression 1500 metres freestyle

References

1901 births
1987 deaths
Swimmers from Stockholm
Swedish male water polo players
Olympic swimmers of Sweden
Swimmers at the 1920 Summer Olympics
Swimmers at the 1924 Summer Olympics
Swimmers at the 1928 Summer Olympics
Olympic gold medalists for Sweden
Olympic silver medalists for Sweden
Olympic bronze medalists for Sweden
Swedish twins
World record setters in swimming
Olympic bronze medalists in swimming
Swedish male freestyle swimmers
Twin sportspeople
European Aquatics Championships medalists in swimming
Stockholms KK swimmers
Medalists at the 1928 Summer Olympics
Medalists at the 1924 Summer Olympics
Olympic gold medalists in swimming
Olympic silver medalists in swimming
20th-century Swedish people